Christopher Lau (Chinese: 劉堃), is the chief executive officer and founder of Ecargo, an ASX listed e-commerce company and co-chief executive officer and co-founder of WWE & Company, a China social shopping mobile platform company.

Education
Lau holds a bachelor's degree in accounting and finance from the Stern School of Business, New York University, where he graduated in 2001.

Business

Lau began his career with Ernst & Young in New York City and subsequently spent two years in Deutsche Bank’s fixed income business in New York.
Christopher Lau was the group assistant managing director and an executive director at Cargo Services Far East Limited from 2006 to 2012. He was an executive director of CS Logistics Holdings Limited from 2010 to 2012. At Cargo Services Far East Limited, Lau founded the GAM division in 2007. He was instrumental in the transformation of Cargo Services Far East Limited to become the leading integrated retail supply chain solutions service provider based in Hong Kong, contributed significantly in the development and implementation of the LIMA platforms for many retail brands and was involved in the acquisition of Allport Limited together with HSBC’s strategic investment in CS Logistics in 2010.

Community and charity work
In 2012, Lau was made Honorary Member of the Court at the Hong Kong Baptist University. He is also a member of the programme and fund raising committee at The Dragon Foundation, a non-profit organisation in Hong Kong.

Family
Lau's father is John Lau Shek Yau, a Hong Kong entrepreneur and logistics tycoon.

References

External links
 Ecargo
 WWE & Company
 Hong Kong Baptist University香港浸會大學
 The Dragon Foundation
 New York University
 Allport Cargo Services
 Deutsche Bank
 Ernst & Young

Hong Kong chief executives
Hong Kong financial businesspeople
New York University Stern School of Business alumni
Hong Kong Baptist University
Living people
Year of birth missing (living people)